Cyrus Longworth Lundell (November 5, 1907 – March 28, 1994) was an American botanist.

Education
Lundell did his undergraduate studies at Columbia University and Southern Methodist University. He completed his BA at the later in 1932. He then entered New York University's graduate school of business administration, but seems not to have completed course work there. He received an M.A. from the University of Michigan in 1934 and a Ph.D. from the same institution in 1936. It appears based on his later professorship that his Ph.D. was in botany.

Early achievement
At the age of 21, in 1928, Lundell was a sophomore at Southern Methodist University (SMU). He was appointed assistant physiologist at the Tropical Plant Research Foundation in Washington, D.C. He was to assist in British Honduras, with experiments on the sapodilla tree (Achras zapota), which yields chicle, for the U.S. chewing gum industry.

Chicle
Chicle is the natural gum from trees of the genus Manilkara, tropical evergreen trees native to southern North America and South America. It was traditionally used in chewing gum. While the Wrigley Company was a prominent user of this material, today there are only a few companies that still make chewing gum from natural chicle.

Work
Lundell's work was a combination of conservation and economics. He was interested in the Maya culture and archaeology as well as botany. While working for the Tropical Plant Research Foundation in 1931, he discovered the Maya city of Calakmul, which had been hidden in the jungle for 1,000 years. He discovered and identified more than 2,000 plants, many of them Texas natives.

Burial
Cyrus Longworth Lundell is buried at Sparkman-Hillcrest Memorial Park Cemetery in Dallas, Texas.

Legacy
Lundell is commemorated in the scientific name of a species of lizard, Sceloporus lundelli.

References

20th-century American botanists
Plant physiologists
1907 births
1994 deaths
Burials at Sparkman-Hillcrest Memorial Park Cemetery
Calakmul
American expatriates in Belize